Jallaad is a 1995 Indian Hindi-language action film, directed by T. L. V. Prasad, released on 15 September 1995. The film stars Mithun Chakraborty in a dual role as father and son in opposing characters – the son has a positive role, whereas the father has the main villain role. The movie has  won him several awards in the Best Actor in a Negative Role category. The film was the remake of the Tamil film Amaithi Padai, starring Satyaraj. It was Rambha's Bollywood debut.

Plot 

An honest diligent police inspector named Kranti Kumar lives with his grandparents. On one of his missions, he is sent to the south where he falls in love with a village girl named Koyal who lives with her parents and little sister Munni. Koyal reciprocates his love. Delighted at Kranti Kumar, Koyal's parents also accept their love and decide to announce their wedding.

Suddenly during their engagement, a mysterious man named Gopinath asks Kranti Kumar about his lifestyle. Gopinath then reveals that he is a bastard son of a corrupt politician by the name of Amavas and mocks Kranti Kumar for not knowing about his parents. An enraged Kranti Kumar beats Gopinath until his grandfather reveals the truth.

Amavas was a poor, but arrogant beggar who became acquainted with Kamalkant, a corrupt politician. Soon Amavas becomes Kamal's right hand man and a young village girl named Gayatri Devi falls for him to whom he reciprocates, but he drugs and rapes her one day. Kamal orders Amavas to stand in politics as an independent candidate because Kamal has not been given a ticket from his party. Amavas changes his name to Vijay Bahadur Kunwar in order to gain status and power much to the shock of Kamal and starts campaigning. Through Kamal's crafty machinations, Amavas wins the election, but forgets Kamal's help and forces Kamal to become his crony. After some days, Gayatri Devi gets pregnant and reveals the good news to Amavas. But Amavas cheats and disowns her and her baby. A furious Gayatri Devi goes to temple stands in front of Kali Devi statue and vows that her son will avenge her humiliation and death. She grabs the trident and tries to kill herself. But as a result, she dies giving birth to her son Kranti. She is buried in a graveyard and the grave was made as famous in a village. Meanwhile, Amavas marries another lady, Tara who is a daughter of a rich landlord and steals the latter's palace. Tara, seeing his corruption refuses to bear him children.

When Kranti discovers the truth about his parents, he vows to kill his father to avenge his mother. He investigates two villagers and discovers his mother's grave. There Kranti meets his stepmother, Tara. After seeing Kranti's face, Tara learns that he is the son of Amavas. Kranti accepts her as his second mother and they vow to bring down Amavas.

One day Kranti sees Amavas. Some goons tries to attack Amavas, but Kranti fires on the goons and save his father and thanks him for saving his life. On the same night, Kranti goes to Amavas's palace and reveals his identity to his father. When Amavas see Kranti's face, he realizes he is his own son. Kranti tells his father he will not spare him for his mother's death to which Amavas brushes off.

Over the years, Amavas has become a notorious dirty politician who doesn't serve the people anymore. He continues to enjoy the power and prestige. Discovering that Tara and Kranti are plotting his downfall, Amavas orders his slave Bhola to kill his second wife. Bhola is hesitant, but hardens his heart to follow his master's order. When Bhola comes to kill Tara, she tries to escape. She calls to her son Kranti, but Bhola stabs her. Kranti arrives there, but it was too late as Tara dies in Kranti's arms. The next day, Tara's dead body was kept at the funeral and knowing that his father was the cause, Kranti charges at Amavas and beats him mercilessly. As a result, Kranti is arrested and jailed.

For his final diabolical plan, Amavas orders Bhola to bring Koyal to his chamber. Kamal, who by this time is fed up of being Amavas's crony and wants to turn a new leaf, protests and tries to protect Koyal, but he is murdered by Bhola. Amavas's henchmen also kidnap Koyal's little sister. Upon the advice of a corrupt priest who tells Amavas that he is going to die soon, Amavas decides to forcibly marry Koyal through a demonic ritual. When Kranti discovers the news, he fights with the police and escapes from jail. He eliminates all of Amavas's henchmen and saves Koyal and her little sister Munni. After brutally beating his father, Kranti has Amavas at his mercy. He takes a trident and impales his father the same way his mother killed herself. Unrepentant to the end and blessing himself with flowers, Amavas's final words before he dies are "Amavas Zindabad".

After Amavas's death, Kranti Kumar surrenders to the police and he is sentenced for three years in jail. After he is released, he marries Koyal and they live happily ever after.

Cast

Soundtrack 
Jallaad included 6 songs – all songs composed by Anand–Milind with lyrics penned by Sameer. The songs topped the charts when released.

Awards

References

External links 

1995 films
1990s Hindi-language films
Mithun's Dream Factory films
Films shot in Ooty
Hindi remakes of Tamil films
Indian action films
Films scored by Anand–Milind
1995 action films
Indian films about revenge
Films directed by T. L. V. Prasad